Abdurahim Laajab (born 21 May 1985), commonly known as Ibba Laajab (イバ), is a professional footballer who plays for Lyn as a winger. Ibba also plays futsal. Born in Morocco, he holds Norwegian citizenship and is one of the key players in the Norway futsal team.

Laajab grew up in Norway and played eight seasons in the Norwegian First Division with Skeid, Notodden, Mjøndalen and Strømmen before he signed with Tippeligaen-side Vålerenga in 2012. After spending the second half of the 2012 season on loan with Stabæk, Ibba joined Bodø/Glimt ahead of the 2013 season.

After two successful campaigns with the Norwegian side he got a transfer to Chinese League One side Hebei China Fortune. After a year there he moved the J2 League side Yokohama FC and has so far enjoyed great success there.

Football career
Ibba was born to Moroccan parents and moved to Norway when he was one month old. He played at Vålerenga and Moss during his youth, and later joined Skeid because his friends were playing there. At Skeid he was teammate with Moa, Mos, Birger Madsen and Dawda Leigh.

Ibba didn't get too much playing time with Skeid, but during the second half of the 2004-season he played 248 minutes in nine matches in the First Division and scored two goals. Ahead of the 2005-season, Ibba and his teammate Moa joined Rosenborg BK on their pre-season tour to La Manga Club. Ibba was sent on a short loan-spell to Drøbak-Frogn in 2005, and left Skeid after the season and signed a one-year contract with Sørumsand which had been relegated from the Third Division.

Before he played a match for Sørumsand, Ibba moved to Borussia Mönchengladbach where Jørn Andersen was the assistant coach. Ibba and Andersen communicated with each other in Norwegian. A year later Andersen was fired together with the head coach, and the new coach only talked to Ibba in German, a language Ibba did not try to learn, and eventually Ibba requested to terminate his contract and moved home to Norway. He only played one match for Borussia Mönchengladbach II.

In 2007 Ibba was back in Skeid, before he signed a contract with Notodden ahead of the 2008-season. Ibba played regularly in the first-team until head coach Jan Halvor Halvorsen was fired halfway through the 2009-season. The new coach, Arne Sandstø placed him on the bench and Ibba left the club after the season. Ahead of the 2010-season, Ibba was on a trial with the Spanish second-tier club Elche and was offered a contract there, but Ibba rejected the offer and decided to move to Mjøndalen instead. Mjøndalen's coach Vegard Hansen stated that Ibba was a risky signing due to his poor reputation, but that the 24-year had such an unredeemed potential that he couldn't ignore him.

Ibba played for Strømmen in 2011, where he scored seven goals in 24 matches in the First Division, and ahead of the 2012-season he signed for Vålerenga. After Ibba's transfer to Vålerenga, his former teammate from Skeid and former Vålerenga-player, Moa, said in an interview with Norwegian TV2 that the supporters of Vålerenga should be excited about their new signing and dubbed Ibba as one of the best newcomers of the 2012 Tippeligaen. Ibba made his first-team debut for Vålerenga in the friendly match against the Second Division-side Nesodden on 11 January 2012. After playing six matches for Vålerenga in Tippeligaen, Ibba was loaned out to Stabæk in August 2012 for the rest of the season.

Ibba joined Bodø/Glimt ahead of the 2013 season, where he was reunited with his coach from Notodden, Jan Halvor Halvorsen. Ibba signed a three-year contract with Bodø/Glimt.

On 25 February 2015, Ibba transferred to China League One side Hebei China Fortune.

On 25 August 2022, he signed for Lyn.

Futsal career
Ibba is known as one of the biggest futsal-star in Norway. In his debut for the Norwegian futsal team, he scored three goals when Norway won 7–2 against Malta on 13 January 2011. The next day he again scored three goals against Malta, before he scored another hat-trick when Norway won against Israel in the qualifying match for the 2012 UEFA Futsal Championship on 20 January, which made a total of nine goals in his first three matches for Norway.

Ahead of the qualifying match against Spain on 15 December 2011, Norway's national team coach Esten O. Sæther called Ibba a "top international futsal player", and that if their chances against Spain was depending on Ibba's performance and that he had to play at his very best. Three days later, Ibba scored the goal that secured a 3–3 draw against Belgium and sent Norway to the playoff round of the 2012 FIFA Futsal World Cup qualifier.

Style of play
Laajab has a good physique, a good temperament and good one-on-one skills and has a great breakthrough force.

Career statistics

References

External links

Profile at Yokohama FC
 Profile at Vålerenga

1985 births
Living people
Footballers from Oslo
Moroccan emigrants to Norway
Norwegian footballers
Norwegian men's futsal players
Association football forwards
Vålerenga Fotball players
Moss FK players
Skeid Fotball players
Drøbak-Frogn IL players
Borussia Mönchengladbach II players
Notodden FK players
Mjøndalen IF players
Strømmen IF players
Stabæk Fotball players
FK Bodø/Glimt players
Hebei F.C. players
Yokohama FC players
Omiya Ardija players
Lyn Fotball players
J2 League players
J1 League players
China League One players
Norwegian Third Division players
Norwegian First Division players
Eliteserien players
Norwegian expatriate footballers
Expatriate footballers in Germany
Norwegian expatriate sportspeople in Germany
Expatriate footballers in China
Norwegian expatriate sportspeople in China
Expatriate footballers in Japan
Norwegian expatriate sportspeople in Japan